The Lommel Proving Ground also known as the Ford LPG, is an automotive proving ground, constructed by Ford of Europe on ground rented from the municipality of Lommel, located south of the Belgian hamlet of Kattenbos. Lommel covers an area of 3.22 km ², and since the development of new models are kept secret, the track closed to the public and heavily guarded. 

In 1964, Ford came to an agreement with the Borough of Lommel to rent a large area of forest on which to develop a test track. The location was chosen as it was midway between Ford's main development centres and production plants in Germany and the United Kingdom, allowing easy integration access. Besides test track there are also environmental chambers, freshwater and saltwater pools.

External links
Official website

Ford of Europe
Buildings and structures in Limburg (Belgium)
Road test tracks
Proving grounds
Lommel
1965 establishments in Belgium